Aernoudt Jacobs (born 1968 in Wilrijk, Belgium) is a Belgian composer, sound artist, and trained architect. His sound artwork is a result of field recordings where sounds are gathered that are used in his compositions. Jacobs aims to create sounds which invoke memories, feelings and specific circumstances to remind the listener of certain moods.

External links 
 

Musicians from Antwerp
People from Wilrijk
1968 births
Living people
Date of birth missing (living people)